Zatyki may refer to the following places:
Zatyki, Gołdap County in Warmian-Masurian Voivodeship (north Poland)
Zatyki, Iława County in Warmian-Masurian Voivodeship (north Poland)
Zatyki, Olecko County in Warmian-Masurian Voivodeship (north Poland)